The 1999–2000 Grand Prix of Figure Skating Final was held in Lyon, France, from January 13 to 16, 2000. It was the culmination of the 1999–2000 Grand Prix Series. Skaters qualified for the event by accumulating points throughout the season. The events of the series were the 1999 Skate America, the 1999 Skate Canada International, the 1999 Sparkassen Cup on Ice, the 1999 Trophée Lalique, the 1999 Cup of Russia, and the 1999 NHK Trophy. The top six skaters in the disciplines of men's singles, ladies' singles, pair skating, and ice dancing met at the final to crown the Grand Prix Final Champion.

The format of the event differed from other years. Singles and pair skaters competed in the short program and the free skating, and ice dancers competed in the original dance and the free dance. The top four finishers in each discipline were split in groups of two and then competed head-to-head in different free skating finals.

Results

Men

Ladies

Pairs

Ice dancing

External links
 1999–2000 Grand Prix of Figure Skating Final

1999 in figure skating
2000 in figure skating
Grand Prix of Figure Skating Final
Grand Prix of Figure Skating Final